The Āmeris House (Persian: خانه عامری‌ها) is a large historic house in Kashan, Iran. It was originally built as a family residence during the reign of the Zand dynasty for Agha Āmeri, the governor of Kashan, and is now restored and transformed into a traditional-style hotel.

Like the other historic houses that are located nearby, the Āmeri House was damaged through earthquakes in the 18th century, and was then rebuilt in the 19th century. It is one of the prominent historic houses of Kashan, together with the Borujerdi House, the Tabātabāei House, and others.

Structure
It contains dozens of rooms, two bathhouses, and seven courtyards with gardens and fountains. The main structure is made of brick. Mud and straw are used in the insulation. The inner spaces are decorated with gypsum and mirror works. Underneath the complex are a series of tunnels. The Āmeri House is now a traditional hotel.

Gallery

References

External links

  (official website)

Houses completed in the 19th century
Buildings and structures in Kashan
Historic house museums in Iran
Tourist attractions in Kashan
Architecture in Iran